George Burr Leonard (August 9, 1923 – January 6, 2010) was an American writer, editor, and educator who wrote extensively about education and human potential. He served as President Emeritus of the Esalen Institute, past-president of the Association for Humanistic Psychology, co-founder of Integral Transformative Practice International, and an editor of Look Magazine.  He was a United States Army Air Corps pilot, and held a fifth-degree black belt in aikido.
Typical of his philosophy, life's work, and the times (1960s), Leonard stated: "Western civilization has been a 2,000 year long exercise in robbing people of the present. People are now learning the powerful joys that hide in the narrow place of the hourglass, the eternal moment. Here is their golden learning: to see - really see - spring flowers; to feel - really feel - the grace of love."

Leonard co-founded the Aikido of Tamalpais dojo, originally in Mill Valley, now in Corte Madera, California.  He also developed the Leonard Energy Training (LET) practice for centering mind, body, and spirit.
Leonard died at his home in Mill Valley, California on January 6, 2010, after a long illness, survived by his wife and three daughters. He was 86 years old.

Books
The Decline of the American Male (1958) ASIN B000JWGFBW
Shoulder the Sky (1959) ASIN B000HLSI5Q
Education and Ecstasy (1968) 
The Man & Woman Thing, and Other Provocations (1970) ASIN B0006DY0R0
The Transformation (1972) 
The Silent Pulse (1978)  
The End of Sex (1983) 
Walking on the Edge of the World (1988) 
Mastery: The Keys to Success and Long-Term Fulfillment (1992) 
The Life We Are Given (1995) 
The Way of Aikido: Life Lessons from an American Sensei (2000) 
The Ultimate Athlete (2001)

References

External links
Article in the Encyclopedia of Aikido
Aikido of Tamalpais
The ITP Founders & Board of Directors
Interview with Sensei George Leonard, April 2000, AikiWeb
NYTimes obituary
The Samurai Game

1923 births
2010 deaths
American aikidoka
American magazine publishers (people)
American martial arts writers
American motivational writers
United States Army Air Forces officers
United States Army Air Forces pilots
People from Mill Valley, California
Sportswriters from California
Military personnel from California